The Arab Socialist Union was an Egyptian political party based on the principles of Nasserist Arab socialism.

History

Foundation

The Arab Socialist Union was founded in Egypt in December 1962 by Gamal Abdel Nasser as the country's sole political party. The ASU grew out of the Free Officers Movement of the Egyptian Revolution of 1952. The party's formation was just one part in Nasser's National Charter. The Charter set out an agenda of nationalization, agrarian reform, and constitutional reform, which formed the basis of ASU policy. The programme of nationalisation under Nasser saw  worth of private assets transferred into the public sector. Private insurance companies, banks, many large shipping companies, major heavy and basic industries were converted to public control. Land reforms saw the maximum area of private land ownership successively reduced from 200 to 100 feddans. Boards of directors were required to have a minimum number of workers, and workers and peasants were guaranteed at least half of the seats in the People's Assembly. The Charter also saw a strong assertion of Arab nationalism, within the context of historical Egyptian nationalism.

In September 1963 a secret unit of the ASU was established which was called the Vanguard Organization. It was headed by Sharawi Gomaa and Sami Sharaf. Following the defeat in the Six-Day War in 1967 Nasser reorganized the ASU, closing its youth branch and executive bureau. He became the head of its national congress and central committee.

Under Sadat and demise
After Nasser's death in 1970, Anwar Sadat quickly moved away from his radical socialist position. This was demonstrated clearly in 1974, with Sadat's Infitah, or Open Door, economic policy, which allowed the emergence of a modern entrepreneurial and consumerist society. Then, in 1976, the beginning of political pluralism allowed three political platforms — left, centre and right — to form within the Arab Socialist Union. In 1978, the platforms were allowed to become fully independent political parties, and the ASU was disbanded. Many of today's political parties in Egypt have their origin in the breakup of the ASU.

Following the Six-Day War and massive demonstrations in February and October 1969, Egypt was in a state of political turmoil, leading to raising calls for granting citizens more democratic rights and demanding self-expression for political affiliations.

Following assuming office in 1970, late president Anwar Sadat adopted the slogans of rule of law and the institutional state. In August 1974, Sadat put forward a working paper to revamp the Arab Socialist Union. In July 1975, the Arab Socialist Union's general conference adopted a resolution on establishing political forums within the union for expression of opinion in accordance with basic principles of the Egyptian Revolution. In March 1976, president Sadat issued a decree allowing three forums to represent the right wing (the Liberal Socialist Organization), the center wing (Egypt Arab Socialist Organization) and the left wing (the National Progressive Unionist Organization).

These forums were later transformed into parties, forming today's Egyptian major political parties. During the first meeting of the People's Assembly on November 22, 1976, president Sadat declared the three political organizations turned into parties.

In June 1977, the law of political party was enacted, allowed the existence of several political parties and demonstrated the shift to a multi-party system. However the ratification of this law had not meant cancellation of the Arab Socialist Union, rather it had given the Union more powers to allow party formation.

The centre wing of the ASU evolved into the National Democratic Party, which was the nation's dominant (and de facto only) party until the Egyptian Revolution of 2011. The left wing became the National Progressive Unionist Party, which remains a player on the Left of Egyptian political spectrum, while the right wing became the Liberal Socialists Party which survives as a less significant player on the scene.

Ideology and internal factions
The Arab Socialist Union goals at that point reflected the following:
There should be state control over the national economy and the public sector should establish institutions to undertake the development process.
Arab nationalism and pan-Arabism should be pursued.
Commitment to the development of Arab Socialism
The state should be answerable to the people and run as a democracy.
Commitment to religion and freedom of faith and worship are essential.

The ASU's nature (a big tent populist party) permitted the formation of three factions in 1970s that represented the various party's souls, amely the rightist Liberal Socialist Organization (economic and Islamic liberal); the centrist Arab Socialist Organization (Islamic socialist) and the leftist Tagammu Organization (progressive, populist and nationalist).

Electoral history

Presidential elections

People's Assembly of Egypt elections 

Notes

During the 1976 election, only the three factions of the ASU ran.

References 

1962 establishments in Egypt
1978 disestablishments in Egypt
Anti-Zionism in Egypt
Anti-Zionist political parties
Arab nationalism in Egypt
Arab Socialist Union
Defunct socialist parties in Egypt
Nasserist political parties
Nationalist parties in Egypt
Pan-Arabist political parties
Parties of one-party systems
Political parties disestablished in 1978
Political parties established in 1962
United Arab Republic

de:Arabische Sozialistische Union